Torraye L. Braggs (born May 15, 1976) is an American professional basketball player born in Fresno, California, formerly of the NBA.

After a college career at Xavier University, Braggs was drafted by the Utah Jazz in the second round of the 1998 NBA Draft, and had short stints in the NBA, with the Houston Rockets (November 2003 and March 2005) and the Washington Wizards (January–February 2004), averaging 2.1 points per game. In the United States, he also played in the CBA, the ABA and the NBDL.

Upon graduating from Xavier, Braggs played professionally in twelve countries, from Spain to the Philippines.

In 2006–2007, Braggs played in Latvian club ASK Rīga, becoming Latvian Basketball League (LBL) champion in that season, averaging 13,4 points per game (13 ppg in domestic competition, 14,4 in Baltic Basketball League). In 2008–2009, Braggs played in the Uruguayan Club Malvin (FUBB).

References

External links
NBA.com profile

1976 births
Living people
African-American basketball players
American expatriate basketball people in Greece
American expatriate basketball people in Iran
American expatriate basketball people in Israel
American expatriate basketball people in Latvia
American expatriate basketball people in Spain
American expatriate basketball people in the Philippines
American men's basketball players
Aris B.C. players
ASK Riga players
Barangay Ginebra San Miguel players
Basketball players from California
Bàsquet Manresa players
CBA All-Star Game players
CB Gran Canaria players
Gimnasia y Esgrima de Comodoro Rivadavia basketball players
Hapoel Jerusalem B.C. players
Houston Rockets players
Ironi Ramat Gan players
Israeli Basketball Premier League players
Junior college men's basketball players in the United States
Liga ACB players
P.A.O.K. BC players
Philippine Basketball Association imports
Qingdao Eagles players
San Jose City College alumni
Sioux Falls Skyforce (CBA) players
Sportspeople from Fresno, California
Tulsa 66ers players
Utah Jazz draft picks
Washington Wizards players
Xavier Musketeers men's basketball players
Yakima Sun Kings players
Power forwards (basketball)
Powerade Tigers players
21st-century African-American sportspeople
20th-century African-American sportspeople